Maria Vergés Pérez (born ?) is a Spanish Aranese politician and musician, currently serving as the Síndic d'Aran, the head of government of Val d'Aran, since October 2020.

A member of the Unity of Aran party, she served as the Director of Culture and Language Policy during the first government of Síndic d'Aran  from 2007 to 2011.

Vergés entered the plenary session of the Conselh Generau d'Aran, the governing body of the Val d'Aran, since winning a seat in the 2019 Aranese Council election representing the  constituency of the  region. She held the position of Vice Síndic d'Aran until she was elected Síndic d'Aran on 19 October 2020 following the resignation of her predecessor, Francis Boya, who left office to become general secretary of the Ministry for the Ecological Transition and the Demographic Challenge (MITECO) within the Spanish government. She formed a new Aranese government on 23 November that year, becoming the third woman to hold the office of Síndic d'Aran after Maria Pilar Busquets and Amparo Serrano Iglesias.

Outside of politics, Vergés is a member of the Aranese dialect band, Bramatopin.

References

Living people
Date of birth unknown
Year of birth unknown
Síndics d'Aran
Members of the Conselh Generau d'Aran
Unity of Aran politicians
Aranese politicians
Aranese women in politics
Women politicians from Catalonia
21st-century Spanish women politicians
Occitan musicians
Occitan-speaking people
Year of birth missing (living people)